The following lists events that have happened in 1813 in the Sublime State of Persia.

Incumbents
 Monarch: Fat′h-Ali Shah Qajar

Events
 Russo-Persian War (1804–13) finished.
 October – Treaty of Gulistan signed between Persia and Russia.

References

 
Persia
Years of the 19th century in Iran
1810s in Iran
Persia